Szilárd Vereș (born 27 January 1996) is a Romanian professional footballer of Hungarian ethnicity, who plays as a midfielder for FK Csíkszereda.

Honours
CFR Cluj
Romanian Cup: 2015–16
Csíkszereda
Liga III: 2018–19

References

External links
 
 

1996 births
Living people
Romanian footballers
Liga I players
Nemzeti Bajnokság I players
Liga II players
CFR Cluj players
Gyirmót FC Győr players
CS Național Sebiș players
FK Csíkszereda Miercurea Ciuc players
CS Mioveni players
Romanian expatriate footballers
Expatriate footballers in Hungary
Romanian expatriate sportspeople in Hungary
Association football midfielders
Sportspeople from Cluj-Napoca